Kevin James Munro (born May 1963) is Ewing Professor of Audiology and director of the Manchester Centre for Audiology and Deafness at the University of Manchester. He is a principal fellow and former chairman of the British Society of Audiology and a NIHR senior investigator, the only audiologist to be awarded that distinction.

References

External links 
https://www.manchesterbrc.nihr.ac.uk/researchers/professor-kevin-munro/

Audiologists
Academics of the University of Manchester
Alumni of the University of Southampton
Academics of the University of Southampton
NIHR Senior Investigators
Living people
1963 births